The Harvey's Resort Hotel bombing took place on August 26–27, 1980, when several men masquerading as photocopier deliverers planted an elaborately booby trapped bomb containing  of dynamite at Harvey's Resort Hotel (now "Harveys") in Stateline, Nevada, United States. After an attempt to disarm the bomb, it exploded, causing extensive damage to the hotel but no injuries or deaths. The total cost of the damage was estimated to be around $18 million. John Birges Sr. was convicted of having made the bomb with a goal of extorting money from the casino after having lost $750,000 there. He died in prison in 1996, at the age of 74.

Background 
John Birges Sr. was a Hungarian immigrant to Clovis, California. He claimed to later biographers he flew for the German Luftwaffe during World War II, during which time he provided intelligence to the United States. He was captured and sentenced to 25 years of hard labor in the Soviet gulag. Eight years into his sentence in the gulag, he was released during a period of mass repatriation of POWs held in the Soviet Union to their home countries and returned to Hungary. From there, he emigrated to the United States. Investigations of Birges's accounts of his life in Europe have not produced any independent evidence of his claims to have flown for the Nazis, spied for the U.S., or been imprisoned in a Soviet gulag.

Birges built a successful landscaping business, but his addiction to gambling led to him losing a large amount of money and prompted the bomb plot. His gambling debt and experience with explosives were primary pieces of evidence linking him to the bombing.

Bombing
As the mastermind behind the bomb, now-former millionaire Birges was attempting to extort $3 million ($ million in ) from the casino, claiming he had lost $750,000 ($ million in ) gambling there.

The FBI went to the spot that they believed to be the ransom drop, but Birges was waiting at a different location due to vague directions. No money was paid to Birges.

The bomb was cleverly built and virtually tamper-proof. The ransom note stated that the bomb could not be disarmed even by the bomb builder, but if paid $3 million, he would give instructions on which combination of switches would allow the bomb to be moved and remotely detonated. The FBI determined that it would take four men to move it, and there was no way to know if the bomb was truly disarmed or safe to move. The FBI decided that the bomb would have to be disarmed in the hotel. All guests and staff were evacuated from the hotel and the gas main was shut off.

After studying the bomb for more than a day through x-rays, bomb technicians decided that, although there were warnings from the bomb maker that a shock would trigger the device, the best hope of disarming it was by separating the detonators from the dynamite. The technicians thought this could be accomplished using a shaped charge of C-4. The attempt to disarm the bomb failed as the technicians did not know that dynamite had also been placed in the top box containing the detonation circuit; the shaped charge detonated the top box explosives, which caused the rest of the bomb to detonate. The bomb destroyed much of the hotel, although no one was injured. The explosion also damaged Harrah's Casino (connected to Harvey's Resort via a tunnel), breaking many of the casino's windows.

The bomb, one of the largest the FBI had ever seen, was loaded with an estimated  of dynamite stolen from a construction site in Fresno, California. According to FBI experts, the Harvey's bomb remains the most complex improvised explosive device they have examined, and a replica of "the machine", as the extortionists called it, was still used in FBI training .

Investigation

The bomb was delivered to the casino's second floor by two men posing as technicians; witnesses spotted a white van marked with "IBM" on the side. Birges was investigated as a possible suspect due to his white van being identified as being in South Tahoe at the time of the bombing. Birges was eventually arrested based on a tip. One of his sons had revealed to his then-girlfriend that his father had placed a bomb in Harvey's. After the two broke up, she was on a date with another man when they heard about a reward for information, and she informed her new boyfriend about Birges. This man then called the FBI.

John Birges' two sons both entered pleas of guilty in 1981 for their roles in the bombing, serving no prison time in exchange for testifying against their father. Birges was convicted in 1982 and sentenced to life in prison without parole.

Birges' two accomplices who delivered the bomb to Harvey's were subsequently sentenced: Terry Lee Hall, in 1982, of conspiracy and interstate transport of explosives; and Hall's father-in-law Willis Brown, who entered a plea of guilty in exchange for a reduced sentence.

In 1983, the final defendant, Ella Joan Williams, named by prosecutors as the typist of the extortion letter, was convicted of attempted extortion, conspiracy, and interstate travel in aid of extortion. 

In 1996, at the age of 74, Birges died of liver cancer at the Southern Nevada Correctional Center, 16 years and a day after the bombing.

References

Further reading
 
 

Attacks in the United States in 1980
1980 in Nevada
Attacks on hotels in North America
August 1980 events in the United States
Building bombings in the United States
Crime in Nevada
Improvised explosive device bombings in 1980
Extortion
History of Douglas County, Nevada
Hotel bombings
Stateline, Nevada